Terry Armstrong (born July 16, 2000) is an American professional basketball player who last played for the South East Melbourne Phoenix of the National Basketball League (NBL).

Armstrong, who is a native of Flint, Michigan, played basketball for several high schools, spending his final two year at Bella Vista Prep. A consensus four-star recruit, he drew interest from several major NCAA Division I programs and committed to Arizona before choosing to immediately play professionally in the NBL.

Early life
Armstrong grew up in the West Side of Flint, Michigan. He often played basketball with others in his neighborhood or shot around in his driveway. He is mentored by his guardian Tim Jones, who is also from Flint.

High school career
As a freshman at Carman-Ainsworth High School in Flint, Armstrong began playing basketball under head coach Jay Witham in the 2015–16 season. After averaging 12.6 points per game through his first six games, he was considered one of the best freshmen in Michigan, garnering attention from prep school programs. Armstrong led his team to the regional semifinals and a 20–4 record, averaging 16 points, 5.5 rebounds, and two steals per game. He earned Class A All-State first team honors from the Associated Press and Class A All-State honorable mention recognition from the Detroit Free Press and The Detroit News.

Entering his 2016–17 sophomore year, Armstrong transferred to Joseph Wheeler High School, a school in Marietta, Georgia with a nationally recognized basketball program. He joined the team with E. J. Montgomery, one of the top recruits in the 2018 class. However, in late November, before playing a game for Wheeler, Armstrong moved to Davison High School in Davison, Michigan. He made the decision following his mother's relocation to the Davison district. Armstrong was forced to sit out his sophomore season after being ruled ineligible by the Michigan High School Athletic Association (MHSAA). While being sidelined, he dropped in national rankings and attracted decreasing attention from college programs. He was also struggling academically, holding a 2.4 grade point average.

As a junior in 2017–18, Armstrong transferred to Bella Vista College Preparatory School in Scottsdale, Arizona. The Bella Vista Prep basketball team, which was newly formed to replace Aspire Academy, played a national schedule and was coached by former Hillcrest Prep coach Kyle Weaver. He was named season MVP of The Grind Session during the 2017–18 season. With Bella Vista Prep and on the Amateur Athletic Union (AAU) circuit, he saw his national ranking rise again. By December 7, 2018, in his senior season, Armstrong was averaging 22.1 points and 5.4 rebounds per game. He was named the 2019 Grind Session Offensive player of the year. On March 11, 2019, he scored 14 points in a 96–94 win over SPIRE Institute and Academy to win the Grind Session World Championship final.

Recruiting
Armstrong was a consensus four-star recruit. By the end of his high school career, ESPN ranked him among the top 40 players in the 2019 class. On October 24, 2018, Armstrong committed to play for NCAA Division I basketball for Arizona, attracted by its coaching staff and environment, as well as his team fit. His other top options were New Mexico and Oklahoma.

Professional career

South East Melbourne Phoenix (2019–2020)
On June 19, 2019, Armstrong revealed his intentions to skip college basketball and instead play in the NBA G League or in another country. On July 5, he signed with the South East Melbourne Phoenix in the National Basketball League (NBL), a league based in Australia. Armstrong joined the team through the NBL Next Stars program, which was created in the previous year to attract NBA draft prospects to the NBL. In September 2019, he won the dunk contest at the NBL Blitz preseason tournament. Armstrong was left out of his team's rotation for much of the season. He made eight appearances for the Phoenix and averaged 2.2 minutes per game. On April 1, 2020, Armstrong declared for the 2020 NBA draft.

Career statistics

NBL

|-
| style="text-align:left;"| 2019–20
| style="text-align:left;"| South East Melbourne
| 8 || 0 || 2.2 || .000 || .000 || 1.000 || .3 || .3 || .0 || .0 || .3

References

External links
NBL profile

2000 births
Living people
American expatriate basketball people in Australia
American men's basketball players
Basketball players from Flint, Michigan
Shooting guards
South East Melbourne Phoenix players